In mathematics, specifically in the study of vector bundles over complex Kähler manifolds, the Nakano vanishing theorem, sometimes called the Akizuki–Nakano vanishing theorem, generalizes the Kodaira vanishing theorem. Given a compact complex manifold M with a holomorphic line bundle F over M, the Nakano vanishing theorem provides a condition on when the cohomology groups  equal zero. Here,  denotes the sheaf of holomorphic (p,0)-forms taking values on F. The theorem states that, if the first Chern class of F is negative,
Alternatively, if the first Chern class of F is positive,

See also
Le Potier's vanishing theorem

References

Original publications

Secondary sources 

Theorems in complex geometry
Topological methods of algebraic geometry
Theorems in algebraic geometry